The western round-eared bat (Lophostoma occidentalis) is a bat species found only on the Pacific coast of northwestern Ecuador.

Taxonomy and etymology
It was described as a new subspecies of the white-throated round-eared bat in 1978 by Davis and Carter. As the white-throated round-eared bat was in the genus Tonatia at the time, the western round-eared bat had a trinomen of Tonatia silvicola occidentalis. In 2011, it was recognized as a full species. In the same publication, it was established that Lophostoma aequatorialis was a junior synonym of L. occidentalis. Its species name "occidentalis" is Latin for "western."

Description
Its dorsal fur is long and dark brown, while the fur around its throat is whitish. It has white or pale gray patches of fur behind its ears.

Range and status
It is found in South America, where its range includes Colombia, Ecuador, and Peru.

As of 2016, it was evaluated as a near-threatened species by the IUCN. Its population has likely declined by 20-25% in the last three generations due to habitat destruction.

References

External links
Image of an adult female from Velazco & Cadenillas 2011

Lophostoma
Bats of South America
Endemic fauna of Ecuador
Mammals of Ecuador
Mammals described in 1978